C Batter C is a video release by ambient techno group The Orb, released in November 2011, featuring a short film titled Battersea Bunches (originally screened in 2010), its soundtrack, and remixes.

Track listing

References 

The Orb albums
2011 video albums